This is a list of educational institutions located in the district of Bahawalpur in Pakistan.

Cholistan University Of Veterinary And Animal Sciences Bahawalpur.

Primary and secondary educational institutions and colleges
Sadiq Public School

Dominican Convent Higher Secondary School Bahawalpur
Govt. Sadiq Egerton College Bahawalpur
Government Sadiq College Women University
Islamia University Bahawalpur
Allied Schools, a project of Punjab Group of Colleges
The Educators
ILM Group of Colleges
Quaid-e-Azam Medical College
zahra medical college
Government College of Technology, Bahawalpur
Government Primary School Chak 39DB Yazman
Government High School Chak 45DB Yazman
Government High School Sajawal Wala
Sadiq Dane High School
Government technical high school Bahawalpur
Moon system of education Bahawalpur
Danish School Hasilpur, School of Saeed Anwar

External links

Bahawalpur
Education in Bahawalpur